Omar Hamdi is a British comedian and television host. His parents, who are from Egypt, moved to the UK in the 1970s. He is best-known as one of the presenters of the BBC Wales consumer affairs programme X-Ray.

Early life

Hamdi is a native of Cardiff, Wales. He initially got into comedy through his ex-girlfriend who suggested that he use comedy as an outlet for his energy.

Career
He is a comic, appearing at major comedy clubs in the UK including The Comedy Store. His stand-up comedy is autobiographical, including varying perspectives on nationality, gender and love, as well as a satirical take on the big issues facing the world.

He began performing stand-up shortly after graduating from Leeds University. He made his national TV debut in 2014, performing stand-up on Seann Walsh's late night show.  He also starred in the chat show "Free Speech"

Hamdi has been heavily involved in the Muslim comedy circuit, including the 2015 HaLOL Christmas Comedy Special  and the 2017 Super Muslim Comedy Tour, that played 11 British cities.

In 2015, Hamdi performed his routine, In the Valley of Kings, at the Edinburgh Fringe. Reviews stated he "delivers with vigour, but he's neither funny nor subtle enough to make an impact."

In 2016 he guest starred in the BBC One political talk show Sunday Morning Live. His appearance led to a public disagreement between him and Lily Allen.

In 2018 he starred in the BBC One special "The Miners Who Made Us", where he was challenged to perform a stand up show in front of an audience of former coal miners.

On 16 July 2019, Hamdi co-founded Pathos Communications, Ltd., a personal branding and PR company, based in London, UK.

He has conducted sometimes controversial celebrity interviews with personalities such as former English Defence League leader Tommy Robinson, politician and reality star George Galloway, and the original Darth Vader, actor David Prowse. In his 2016 interview with Hamdi, George Galloway revealed for the first time details of the sexual abuse he suffered as a child at the hands of an army officer. Hamdi received criticism for his perceived efforts to help rehabilitate Robinson's reputation and public standing.

Writing career
As well as TV hosting and stand-up, he writes for newspapers and magazines, and has been published in two books, Pause for Thought and Don't Panic I'm Islamic. For the latter he undertook a stand-up and book tour around the UK, after it was selected as Sunday Times Humour Book of the Year. He has also written and presented on four series of BBC Radio 2’s award-winning show Pause for Thought. He claims to rarely watch stand-up on television, or any television at all.

References 

1985 births
Living people
British comedians
British television presenters
21st-century British comedians
21st-century British writers